Acacia macnuttiana, commonly known as McNutt's wattle, is a flowering plant in the family Fabaceae and is endemic to north-eastern New South Wales. It is a shrub with linear phyllodes, spherical heads of bright yellow flowers arranged in racemes in leaf axils and seeds usually in more or less straight, leathery pods.

Description

Taxonomy and naming
Acacia macnuttiana was first formally described in 1927 by Joseph Maiden and William Blakely in the Journal and Proceedings of the Royal Society of New South Wales from specimens collected in 1913 near the village of Bismuth near Torrington by Andrew McNutt who had been a schoolteacher at Hillgrove.

Distribution and habitat
McNutt's wattle grows near rivers and along valleys on sandy soils derived from granite from near Torrington to Boonoo Boonoo Falls, near Pindari Dam and the Washpool National Park, in north-eastern New South Wales.

Conservation status
This acacia is listed as "Vulnerable" under the Commonwealth EPBC Act, and "Endangered" under the Threatened Species Conservation Act of New South Wales.

See also
 List of Acacia species
 Fabaceae

References

macnuttiana
Flora of New South Wales
Plants described in 1927
Taxa named by Joseph Maiden
Taxa named by William Blakely